Silk Sonic is an American musical superduo composed of musicians Bruno Mars and Anderson .Paak. The duo released their debut single, "Leave the Door Open", in March 2021.  They later released "Skate" in July 2021, followed by third single, "Smokin out the Window", and their debut album, An Evening with Silk Sonic, in November 2021. The album peaked at number two on the Billboard 200, while the first three singles reached the top twenty on the Billboard Hot 100, with "Leave the Door Open" spending 18 weeks in the top ten and two non-consecutive weeks at the top spot. The song later won four Grammy Awards, including Record of the Year and Song of the Year.

History

2017–present: Beginnings, breakthrough, and An Evening with Silk Sonic

In 2017, Anderson .Paak was the opening act for Bruno Mars on the European leg of the 24K Magic World Tour. In April, Mars and .Paak worked together at Abbey Road Studios in London with Nile Rodgers and Guy Lawrence for Chic's album It's About Time, and worked on music while on tour that appeared on Paak's album Ventura. The duo was formed in 2017 by Mars and .Paak "as a joke the two friends hatched on the road".

On February 26, 2021, Mars announced that he and .Paak had formed a band, saying, "[Silk Sonic] locked in and made an album." In a press release, they said Bootsy Collins named the band after he heard the album. "Leave the Door Open", the band's debut album's lead single, was released on March 5, along with the intro song, hosted by Collins. The band made its television debut at the 63rd Annual Grammy Awards performing the single, alongside a tribute to Little Richard consisting of "Long Tall Sally" and "Good Golly, Miss Molly".

"Leave the Door Open" was performed again at the 2021 iHeartRadio Music Awards, with a similar aesthetic. The duo won Best Group at the BET Awards 2021. At the same ceremony, it performed "Leave the Door Open" again, alongside teasers of its forthcoming releases.

On July 28, Mars announced that Silk Sonic would host a "Summertime Jam" two days later. This event turned out to mark the release of another single, "Skate", which was released on July 30 alongside an accompanying video.

In October, the band announced that the album's release had been pushed ahead to November 12.

On November 5, Silk Sonic released its third single, "Smokin out the Window", a week before the album's launch. On November 12, An Evening with Silk Sonic was released. On November 21, "Smokin' Out the Window" was performed as the opening act of the American Music Awards of 2021, where the duo also won Favorite Song – R&B.

On January 19, 2022, it was announced that the duo will host a residency concert series at the Park MGM in Las Vegas. On February 3, they were announced to also make an appearance in Fortnite. On February 14, the duo released a cover of Con Funk Shun's "Love's Train", which was later released as single in Italy, making it the group's fourth single. On April 21, 2022, Billboard reported that "Love's Train" was the album's fourth single, with no official date of release in the United States. "After Last Night" was released as the next single on July 5, 2022.

Musical style
Silk Sonic's musical style has been described as R&B, soul, funk, pop, hip hop, and smooth soul. Its sound has also been described as disco-inspired. Of An Evening with Silk Sonic'''s sound, The Ringer wrote, "though styled as a 1960s to '70s retro endeavor, Silk Sonic isn't a work of nostalgia but rather a fusion: funk, rap, and R&B as they've sounded in heavy rotation as recently as the 2000s." Sputnikmusic called the album "rich and authentic, existing at the irresistible intersection between 70s funk nostalgia and the luxuries of a modern day studio. As a result, An Evening With Silk Sonic'' lives up to its billing as a true experience: it’s sexy, ever-so-smooth, and radiates confidence and charisma."

Band members
 Bruno Mars – vocals, production, guitar, piano, congas (2021–present)
 Anderson .Paak – vocals, drums, production (2021–present)

Discography

Studio albums

Singles

Promotional singles

Other charted songs

Awards and nominations

Notes

References

External links
 
 

2021 establishments in the United States
American musical duos
American supergroups
Bruno Mars
Brit Award winners
Contemporary R&B supergroups
Musical groups established in 2021
American soul musical groups
American pop music duos
American funk musical groups